WKAG-CA, UHF analog channel 43, was a Class A low-power television station licensed to Hopkinsville, Kentucky, United States. The station was owned by local cable television provider NewWave Communications, which carried the station on its systems in Christian and Muhlenburg counties in Kentucky. It was also available on CDE Lightband in Montgomery County, Tennessee, including the Clarksville area.

History
Founded December 9, 1983, the station went on the air in July 1984 as W43AG under the ownership of the publisher of the Kentucky New Era newspaper. It was the first standalone low-power television station to ever sign on in Kentucky. The call letters were changed to WKAG-LP in 1994 (after the Federal Communications Commission (FCC) allowed low-power stations to use traditional call signs with an "-LP" suffix, instead of a translator-style call sign; it was the first LPTV station in Kentucky to do so). The callsign was changed again to WKAG-CA in 2002, when the station was upgraded to Class A status.

The New Era sold the station to Owen Broadcasting, controlled by station manager Eddie Owen, in mid-2004; in 2010, NewWave purchased the station from Owen and rebranded the station as "Source16", after the station's new cable slot (before the acquisition, WKAG was instead seen on cable channel 3).

On August 5, 2011, at 3 p.m., Source16 employees were informed that the station would be shut down. No warning was given to employees prior to the shutdown. On September 14, 2012, due to the station having been off the air for more than twelve months, the FCC canceled the station's license and deleted the WKAG-CA call sign from its database.

Past programming

General programming
The station was formatted as an independently-programmed station with a huge emphasis of local activities, news, and sports. However, the station did maintain an affiliation with America One, but the station also broadcast some syndicated programming. The station also provided local coverage of worship services by the First, Second, and St. John's Baptist churches of Hopkinsville. National news inserts were provided by CNN throughout the station's life. The station also carried some programming from All News Channel from 1989 to 2002. At some time in the late 1980s, the station also ran some programming from the short-lived Hit Video Network.

Sports programming
During the mid-to-late 1990s and the early to mid-2000s, WKAG-CA has also broadcast select Southeastern Conference (SEC) football and men's basketball games produced and syndicated by Jefferson Pilot Sports (later Lincoln Financial Sports, then Raycom Sports), as well as some locally produced coverage of Austin Peay Governors football and basketball. The station also aired Bowling Green-based WKYU-TV's Hilltopper Sports Satellite Network coverage of Western Kentucky Hilltoppers basketball and football games. In addition, WKAG also aired programming related to the Kentucky Wildcats from the television unit of UK Sports Network, syndicated through Lexington's CBS affiliate WKYT. The station also aired St. Louis NBC affiliate KSDK's coverage of Major League Baseball games involving the St. Louis Cardinals until 2010.

News operation
WKAG's news operation began in the mid-1980s, initially producing 22½ hours of newscasts on weekdays, including four 15-minute newscasts between 6 and 8 a.m., three 30-minute newscasts at 5, 10, and 11:30 p.m., as well as two 60-minute newscasts at 6 and 8 p.m. Most afternoon and evening newscasts were also run on weekends. The station's news operation had already received praise for the production of their newscasts; indeed, the station's 10 p.m. newscast even won an award for Best Local Production in News division at the 2nd Annual LPTV Conference & Exposition in 1989. The station even won an award for a televised advertisement for a local feed store that same year.

During the 1990s, WKAG's news department produced three newscasts (at 6:00, 9:00, and 10:00 p.m.) on weekdays with an encore of the 10 p.m. newscast at 12 midnight. Newscasts on Saturdays and Sundays were broadcast at 5:00 and 10:00 p.m. Each newscast was 30 minutes long, so WKAG produced 9½ hours worth of newscasts. During the 2000s, the 6:00 and 9:00 p.m. newscasts focused on the Pennyrile region of Western Kentucky, the 6:30 and 9:30 p.m. newscasts focused on the "Queen City", which is the Clarksville area, and the 10 p.m. newscasts. A locally produced program called 43 Magazine showcased local businesses and organizations, and their upcoming events and/or promotions. They came in morning and afternoon editions every weekday.
 By the mid-2000s, WKAG moved the replay of the 10 p.m. newscasts to 1:00 a.m. Newscast names were changed to NewsWatch Hopkinsville (6, 9, and 10 p.m.), and NewsWatch Clarksville (6:30, 9:30, and 10:30 p.m.), thus expanding the total newscasts to a maximum of 19 hours per week. All national news video clips were provided by CNN. Newscasts were discontinued on August 5, 2011, amid uncertainty about the station's future (it was not included in the sale of NewWave's area cable systems to Time Warner Cable). It still rebroadcast news programming from Lexington's WKYT.

Coverage area 
In addition to its over-the-air signal coverage, the station was carried on local Cable television systems in five counties in Kentucky (e.g. Christian, Caldwell, southern Hopkins, Todd, and Trigg), as well as three north-central Tennessee counties (Cheatham, Montgomery, and Robertson), serving 80,000 homes with cable TV.

References

External links
WKAG-TV 43 Hopkinsville, Kentucky (Archived June 13, 2003)
WKAG Online (Archived August 3, 2002)

Hopkinsville, Kentucky
KAG-CA
Television channels and stations established in 1984
1984 establishments in Kentucky
Television channels and stations disestablished in 2011
2011 disestablishments in Kentucky
Defunct television stations in the United States
KAG-CA